In finance, a basket is a weighted group (a linear combination) of several financial instruments. The purpose could be for example simultaneous buying or selling, for example during program trading.

Certain specific specialized "baskets":
 A stock market index is a basket for all the securities in a particular exchange.
 A market basket is a basket for all the securities on a particular market.
 A combination of individual assets, used as an underlying of a basket option.

See also
Currency basket

Securities (finance)